The following is a list of the MuchMusic Video Awards winners for Best R&B Video or Best Soul/R&B Video. This award is now defunct, and has not been awarded since 2004.

R&B